Erik Lie is a Norwegian finance professor at the University of Iowa who published a report about options backdating that led to many investigations by the SEC into the potentially illegal practice.  He was the subject of profile in Business Week for his contribution to uncovering options backdating scandals.

In 1991 and 1992 he served in the Royal Norwegian Navy and Norwegian Coast Guard.

In 2007, he was listed as one of the Time 100, with the article on his contributions being written by former New York Governor and New York State Attorney General Eliot Spitzer.

Professor Lie is recognized by his students as having a striking resemblance to the Footloose actor, Kevin Bacon.

Selected publications

References

External links

Living people
Royal Norwegian Navy personnel
Norwegian expatriates in the United States
University of Oregon alumni
University of Iowa faculty
Year of birth missing (living people)